Promiscuous may refer to behavior that is indiscriminate. While mainly used in social context to refer to sexual behavior, it is also used in a technical sense in a number of fields such as data flow and control, signalling, connectivity, and a range of sciences:
"Promiscuous" (song), a 2006 song by Nelly Furtado featuring Timbaland (also known as both "Promiscuous Girl" and/or "Promiscuous Boy")
Enzyme promiscuity, the catalysis of more than one reaction by an enzyme
Promiscuity, promiscuous sexual behaviour
Promiscuous Judge, a type of judicial officer in Colombia
Promiscuous mode, a configuration where a network card passes all traffic it receives to the CPU, rather than just the packets addressed to it

See also
Loose (disambiguation)